Asim Kumar Sarkar is an Indian politician from Bharatiya Janata Party and a folk singer (Kavigan). In May 2021, he was elected as a member of the West Bengal Legislative Assembly from Haringhata (constituency). He defeated Nilima Nag of All India Trinamool Congress by 15,200 votes in 2021 West Bengal Assembly election.

Recently mahogany and mango trees of the MLA's land were cut down by miscreants, the arrow of his accusation is against the opposition's miscreants.

References 

Living people
Year of birth missing (living people)
21st-century Indian politicians
People from Nadia district
Bharatiya Janata Party politicians from West Bengal
West Bengal MLAs 2021–2026
Indian male folk singers